Slam Book is a 2015 Marathi language drama film which is produced by Ruturaj D Film Productions and directed by Ruturaj Dhalgade. The screenplay by Ruturaj Dhalgade centres on a teenage love story.

Cast 

 Shantanu Rangnekar - Hruday 
 Ritika Shroti - Aparna 
 Dilip Prabhavalkar - Krishna kant Aajoba
 Kushal Badrike - Vishnu
 Usha Nadkarni - Sumi Aaji
 Mrunmayee Deshpande - Grown up Aparna 
 Siddharth Menon - Grown up Hruday
 Mangesh Desai - Mama
 Yash Abbad - Friend 
 Supriya Pathare
 Yogesh Sirsat
 Kanchi Shinde - Meera
 Ketki Gokhle - Urvashi

References 

2015 films
2010s Marathi-language films